Mad as Hell is a 2014 documentary film about the web series The Young Turks and its host, Cenk Uygur. The film's title refers to a famous line uttered by the character Howard Beale in the 1976 film Network, "I'm as mad as hell, and I'm not going to take this anymore!"

Synopsis
The film details how Cenk Uygur created the web series The Young Turks. The film also chronicles Uygur's time as a potential host at MSNBC before his departure in June 2011, citing conflicting views between Uygur and MSNBC executives.

Cast
Cenk Uygur
Ana Kasparian
Ben Mankiewicz
John Iadarola

Production
The film was funded via Indiegogo. It raised $69,423, which was 116% of its $60,000 goal.

Release
It was released theatrically in the USA on November 6, 2014, and on DVD on April 7, 2015.

Reception
On review aggregator Rotten Tomatoes, the film holds an approval rating of 27% based on eleven reviews, with an average rating of 5.54/10. On Metacritic, the film has a weighted average score of 52 out of 100, based on nine critics, indicating "mixed or average reviews".

Writing for RogerEbert.com,  Godfrey Cheshire awarded it a score of 3 out of four stars, saying that Uygur's "pioneering efforts certainly remind us how controlled most 'news' in this country is, and how much alternatives to them are needed."

The Hollywood Reporter said, "Mad as Hell is far too subjective to take seriously."

TheWrap also awarded the film a negative review, saying "'Mad as Hell' will probably reward fans of Uygur and The Young Turks, but much like the clips we see of Uygur in his full-flowering arm-waving wrath, it’s just sound and fury signifying very, very little."

Slant Magazine awarded it 2 and a half out of four stars, and was critical of how the film focused primarily on Uygur rather than current media practices, saying "Yet instead of using Uygur as a means to further an investigation into current media practices, Napier is ultimately too enamored with the man and his convictions that the film hews more closely to being a conventional and one-sided biographical portrait." We Got This Covered made a similar criticism, saying "Mad As Hell is a rare opportunity to use the life story of Cenk Uygur to say something about the modern media culture, but instead, it’s kind of about the awesomeness of Uygur, how he put together his Ocean’s 11 like team of media upstarts and rocked the so-called squares in their ivory tower, despite the fact that the man leading the revolution longed to have a corner office in one of those very same towers." They awarded it three out of five stars.

References

External links

2014 films
American documentary films
2014 documentary films
2010s biographical films
Documentary films about journalism
The Young Turks (talk show)
Crowdfunded films
Indiegogo projects
2010s English-language films
2010s American films